The Ceuthomadarinae are a subfamily of small moths in the family Lecithoceridae.

Taxonomy and systematics
Ceuthomadarus Mann, 1864

References

 
Lecithoceridae
Moth subfamilies